Edna Berenice Telford (born February 28, 1899) was an American Democratic politician from Plainville, Massachusetts. She represented the 9th Norfolk district in the Massachusetts House of Representatives from 1955 to 1960.

References

1899 births
Year of death missing
Members of the Massachusetts House of Representatives
Women state legislators in Massachusetts
20th-century American politicians
20th-century American women politicians
People from Plainville, Massachusetts